Jorge Bardou Delgado (born 5 March 1965) is a former tennis player from Spain.

Bardou represented his native country in the singles competition at the 1984 Summer Olympics in Los Angeles.

Bardou's highest ranking in singles was world No. 173, which he reached on 9 May 1985. His highest doubles ranking was world No. 104, which he reached on 14 April 1986.

Grand Prix career finals

Doubles: (1 runner-up)

External links
 
 

1965 births
Living people
Olympic tennis players of Spain
Spanish male tennis players
Tennis players from Barcelona
Tennis players at the 1984 Summer Olympics